Sergiu Cojocari (born 15 May 1988) is a Moldovan football player who currently is playing for Academia Chișinău.

Cojocari was called up to the senior Moldova national football team for friendlies against Malta and Andorra in March 2016.

References

External links
 
 
 Sergiu Cojocari pe divizianationala.com
 
 
 
 Sergiu Cojocari pe moldova.sports.md

1988 births
Living people
Footballers from Chișinău
Moldovan footballers
Association football defenders
FC Zimbru Chișinău players
FC Sfîntul Gheorghe players
FC Veris Chișinău players
FC Dacia Chișinău players